Sagar Theke Phera is a Bengali language poetry book written by Premendra Mitra. The book was first published in 1956. Mitra received the Sahitya Akademi Award in 1957 for this work. The book also received Rabindra Puraskar in 1958.

References 

Bengali-language books
Sahitya Akademi Award-winning works